Barry Douglas Milburn (born 24 November 1943) is a former New Zealand cricketer who played three Test matches for New Zealand in 1969.

Cricket career
Milburn was born in Dunedin. A wicketkeeper and lower-order right-handed batsman, he played first-class cricket for Otago from 1964 to 1983.

He was one of a succession of New Zealand Test wicketkeepers of modest batting ability in the mid to late 1960s, and was first choice for only one Test series, the three matches in New Zealand against the West Indies in 1968-69 when, like his immediate predecessor Roy Harford, he batted at number 11. Milburn also toured England in 1969 and India and Pakistan in 1969–70, but Ken Wadsworth, a better batsman, played as the principal keeper on both tours. An injury in the later stages of the England tour did not help Milburn's cause at a time when Wadsworth was struggling for runs.

Milburn dropped out of first-class cricket after the 1973–74 season, but returned to play for Otago in 1980–81. He scored a century in his comeback match against Wellington, when he went in as nightwatchman, and Otago went on to win by one wicket. His next highest score in a 19-year career was only 36. He finally retired after the 1982–83 season.

Later life
Milburn was the wicket-keeping coach at the New Zealand Cricket Academy for five years. Later he lived in Queensland for 18 years, managing apartment buildings.

He retired and returned to New Zealand in 2016, to live in Mosgiel, near Dunedin. He and his wife Jen have three daughters. One of them, Rowan, kept wicket for both the Netherlands and New Zealand at international level in the 2000s.

References

External links
 

1943 births
Living people
Cricketers from Dunedin
New Zealand cricketers
New Zealand Test cricketers
Otago cricketers
People educated at Taieri College
South Island cricketers
Wicket-keepers